Utica station was a Chicago, Rock Island and Pacific Railroad station in North Utica, Illinois (also known as Utica). The station is about 90 miles west of Chicago and is on one of the few double tracked parts of the CSX New Rock Subdivision (Joliet—Bureau). It is also just west of a grain elevator and a small yard to load hopper cars. The building was heavily damaged by an April 20, 2004 tornado, that killed 8 in Utica. Because of that damage, it was eventually razed.

References

External links

Picture 1
Picture 2

Railway stations in LaSalle County, Illinois
Former railway stations in Illinois
Historic American Engineering Record in Illinois
Former Chicago, Rock Island and Pacific Railroad stations